Netherlands competed at the 2022 World Games held in Birmingham, United States from 7 to 17 July 2022. Athletes representing the Netherlands won three gold medals, three silver medals and four bronze medals. The country finished in 21st place in the medal table.

Medalists

Competitors
The following is the list of number of competitors in the Games.

Acrobatic gymnastics

Netherlands competed in acrobatic gymnastics.

Archery

Netherlands competed in archery.

Compound

Recurve

Bowling

Netherlands competed in bowling.

Canoe marathon

Netherlands competed in canoe marathon.

Canoe polo

Netherlands competed in canoe polo.

Cue sports

Netherlands won one gold medal in cue sports.

Dancesport

Netherlands competed in dancesport (breaking).

Duathlon

Netherlands competed in duathlon.

Ju-jitsu

Netherlands won several medals in ju-jitsu.

Karate

Netherlands competed in karate.

Men

Women

Kickboxing

Netherlands competed in kickboxing.

Korfball

Netherlands won the gold medal in the korfball tournament.

Orienteering

Netherlands competed in orienteering.

Parkour

Netherlands won two medals in parkour.

Powerlifting

Netherlands competed in powerlifting.

Trampoline gymnastics

Netherlands competed in trampoline gymnastics.

Tug of war

Netherlands won one bronze medal in tug of war.

References

Nations at the 2022 World Games
2022
World Games